Death Jr. and the Science Fair of Doom is a Nintendo DS platform game developed by Backbone Entertainment, and is one of the sequels to the PlayStation Portable game Death Jr. released in 2005. The other is Death Jr. II: Root of Evil for the PSP. In this game, Death Jr. and Pandora are both playable. The game uses both screens, as well as the touch capabilities. It also features local wireless multiplayer.

Gameplay

Plot

Reception

The game was met with mixed to negative reception, as GameRankings gave it a score of 50.42% while Metacritic gave it 47 out of 100.

References

External links
 Death Jr. Official Site
 Konami official page
 

Nintendo DS games
Nintendo DS-only games
Platform games
Konami games
2007 video games
Video games about death
Video games developed in Canada
Fictional personifications of death